Nomadewuka Nancy Sihlwayi is a South African politician, who was elected to the National Assembly of South Africa in the 2019 general elections as a member of the African National Congress. She had previously served as the Member of the Executive Council (MEC) responsible for the Department of Social Development in the Eastern Cape provincial government.

Sihlwayi currently serves as a member of the  Portfolio Committee on Human Settlements. She was previously a member of the Portfolio Committee on Human Settlements, Water and Sanitation.

References

External links
Profile at Parliament of South Africa

Living people
Place of birth missing (living people)
Year of birth missing (living people)
Xhosa people
People from the Eastern Cape
Members of the Eastern Cape Provincial Legislature
Women members of provincial legislatures of South Africa
Members of the National Assembly of South Africa
Women members of the National Assembly of South Africa
African National Congress politicians